The 1995 PBA All-Filipino Cup Finals was the best-of-7 series basketball championship of the 1995 PBA All-Filipino Cup, and the conclusion of the conference playoffs. The Sunkist Orange Juicers and Alaska Milkmen played for the 60th championship contested by the league.

Sunkist Orange Juicers won over Alaska Milkmen in a thrilling seven-game series for their third PBA title. The Juicers became the 8th team to win the All-Filipino crown.

Qualification

Series scoring summary

Games summary

Game 1

Alaska rallied from 12 points down and held Sunkist scoreless in the last 1:28. Jojo Lastimosa, who finish with 34 points, Abarrientos, Hawkins and rookie Jeffrey Cariaso knock in the Milkmen's last eight points to seal the come-from-behind win.

Game 2

Nelson Asaytono led a fourth quarter assault as he struck for six points in a 10–2 blast by the Juicers starting the final period that turned a slim 70–68 lead to an 80–70 advantage. The Milkmen did not score for more than five minutes during the Juicers' run.

Game 3

Bonel Balingit banged in a career-high 22 points, poured in 14 of his points in the decisive fourth quarter as the Juicers, who trailed by as many as 14 points in the third period, came back to outscored the Milkmen, 32–18 in the final 12 minutes.

Game 4

Jeffrey Cariaso scored 11 of Alaska's last 13 points and broke the final tie at 81-all with a driving layup, Sunkist' Rudy Distrito committed a flagrant foul on Cariaso when he hit the rookie's back on the way down from a layup, sending him crashing to the floor. Vergel Meneses, who won best player of the conference, put on an awesome display of firepower in the third quarter, scoring the Juicer's first 16 points with three triples.

Game 5

Sunkist led by as much as 22 points, the last at 80–58. Bong Hawkins scored 24 of his 28 points in the second half as he combined with Johnny Abarrientos to bring the milkmen to within two, 87–89 with only 1:26 left. Juicers' guard Ricric Marata struck inside with a layup and Bonel Balingit's short stab and a foul off Alaska's Poch Juinio gave Sunkist a 93–87 edge.

Game 6

Alaska held down Vergel Meneses to only 16 points while Johnny Abarrientos poured in 19 of his 21 points in the second half, most of them in the third quarter run, a Poch Juinio follow up on a Lastimosa miss gave Alaska an 85–74 lead with only 1:15 left.

Game 7

Bonel Balingit and Ricric Marata knock in nine of Sunkist' 13 points in overtime as the Juicers held on to beat Alaska and hand coach Derrick Pumaren his first PBA title. Vergel Meneses sank in a clutch triple with time winding down in regulation after the Milkmen battled back from 13 points to take a 73–69 lead. Yoyoy Villamin scored on a Meneses assist to tie the count at 74-all with 10 seconds left, Johnny Abarrientos missed on a short jumper inside the paint as Alaska blew a chance to win the game outright.

Occurrences
Sunkist' Rudy Distrito was sacked by the PBA for the rest of the season for nudging Jeffrey Cariaso in mid air during Game 4. An incident also took place in that game involving a bodyguard of Alaska team owner Wilfred Uytengsu, who harassed Distrito and Vergel Meneses following Distrito's dangerous foul on Jeffrey Cariaso.

Rosters

Broadcast notes

References

External links
PBA official website

1995 PBA season
1995
Alaska Aces (PBA) games
Pop Cola Panthers games
PBA All-Filipino Cup Finals